Deh-e Bad-e Sofla (also Romanized as Deh-e Bād-e Soflá) is a village in Chenarud-e Jonubi Rural District, Chenarud District, Chadegan County, Isfahan Province, Iran. At the 2006 census, its population was 190, in 43 families.

References 

Populated places in Chadegan County